The Canada national beach soccer team represents Canada in international beach soccer competitions and is controlled by the Canadian Soccer Association, the governing body for soccer in Canada.

Current squad
As of 13 February 2017

Achievements
 FIFA Beach Soccer World Cup Best: Seventh Place
 1996, 1999, 2006
 CONCACAF Beach Soccer Championship Best: Runners-up
 2006
 Copa Latina Best: Fourth place
 2003

See also

 Canada men's national futsal team
 Canada men's national soccer team
 Soccer in Canada

References

External links
 Canada’s Beach Soccer Team set for qualifying in Bahamas (CanadaSoccer.com)

 

North American national beach soccer teams
Canadian Soccer Association
Beach Soccer
Beach soccer in Canada